Tribuna Monumental, or the Monumento a las Águilas Caídas, is a monument in Chapultepec, Mexico City, commemorating Mexican army officers in Squadron 201, who fought on the Pacific front during World War II.

References

External links

 

Chapultepec
Military monuments and memorials
Monuments and memorials in Mexico City